Yuya Shirai  (born April 2, 1980) is a Japanese professional mixed martial artist currently competing in the Welterweight division. A professional competitor since 2003, Shirai has fought for ONE FC, DEEP, BAMMA, Glory World Series, M-1 Global, Pancrase, DREAM, and is a former DEEP Welterweight Champion.

Mixed martial arts career

Background
Shirai comes from a judo background and holds a black belt in the discipline. On June 8, 2003, he won the Japanese National Sambo Championship in the under 90 kilograms weight class.

Early career
Shirai made his debut in mixed martial arts on September 15, 2003. He is currently signed with DEEP in the Welterweight division, and won the DEEP Welterweight Championship in January 2010 by defeating Seichi Ikemoto.

He also took part in the DREAM Welterweight Grand Prix 2009, losing to Jason High by rear naked-choke in the first round. He then beat Che Mills at Hidehiko Yoshida's farewall event ASTRA.

On February 26, 2011, he faced Paul Daley at BAMMA 5: Daley vs. Shirai in Manchester, England. Shirai lost the fight via KO in the first round.

It was announced on 14 June 2011 that he would be facing Murilo Bustamante at a Clube da Luta event in Rio de Janeiro, Brazil on the 20th July. However Bustamante later pulled out of the bout due to injury and was replaced by
Delson Heleno in what will now be a 180-pound catchweight contest.

He will face Tommy Depret at Glory 2: Brussels on October 6, 2012, in Brussels, Belgium.

Championships and accomplishments
DEEP Welterweight Championship (One time)

Mixed martial arts record

| Win
| align=center| 26-14-2
| Ikuhisa Minowa
| Decision (unanimous)
| DEEP: 75 Impact
| 
| align=center| 3
| align=center| 5:00
| Tokyo, Japan
|
|-
| Win
| align=center| 25-14-2
| Hiroshi Takahashi
| Submission (guillotine choke)
| Tribe Tokyo Fight: TTF Challenge 05
| 
| align=center| 2
| align=center| 1:36
| Tokyo, Japan
|
|-
| Loss
| align=center| 24–14–2
| Yuta Watanabe
| TKO (punches)
| DEEP: 70 Impact
| 
| align=center| 1
| align=center| 2:34
| Tokyo, Japan
| For DEEP Welterweight Championship.
|-
| Win
| align=center| 24–13–2
| Yuki Okano
| Decision (split)
| DEEP: Cage Impact 2014
| 
| align=center| 3
| align=center| 5:00
| Tokyo, Japan
| 
|-
| Draw
| align=center| 23–13–2
| Akihiro Murayama
| Draw (majority)
| DEEP: Tribe Tokyo Fight
| 
| align=center| 3
| align=center| 5:00
| Tokyo, Japan
| 
|-
| Loss
| align=center| 23–13–1
| Dan Hornbuckle
| Decision (unanimous)
| DEEP: 62 Impact
| 
| align=center| 3
| align=center| 5:00
| Tokyo, Japan
| 
|-
| Win
| align=center| 23–12–1
| Yuki Okano
| Decision (unanimous)
| DEEP: 61 Impact
| 
| align=center| 2
| align=center| 5:00
| Tokyo, Japan
| 
|-
| Loss
| align=center| 22–12–1
| Tommy Depret
| TKO (punches)
| Glory World Series: Glory 2: Brussels
| 
| align=center| 3
| align=center| N/A
| Brussels, Belgium
| 
|-
| Loss
| align=center| 22–11–1
| Fabricio Monteiro
| Decision (unanimous)
| ONE Fighting Championship: War of the Lions
| 
| align=center| 3
| align=center| 5:00
| Kallang, Singapore
| 
|-
| Win
| align=center| 22–10–1
| Taisuke Okuno
| Decision (unanimous)
| Deep: 56 Impact
| 
| align=center| 3
| align=center| 5:00
| Tokyo, Japan
| 
|-
| Win
| align=center| 21–10–1
| Yoshitomo Watanabe
| Decision (unanimous)
| Deep: Cage Impact 2011 in Tokyo, 2nd Round
| 
| align=center| 2
| align=center| 5:00
| Tokyo, Japan
| 
|-
| Loss
| align=center| 20–10–1
| Delson Heleno
| Decision (majority)
| Clube da Luta
| 
| align=center| 3
| align=center| 5:00
| Rio de Janeiro, Brazil
| 
|-
| Loss
| align=center| 20–9–1
| Paul Daley
| KO (punches)
| BAMMA 5
| 
| align=center| 1
| align=center| 1:46
| Manchester, England
| 
|-
| Win
| align=center| 20–8–1
| Shigetoshi Iwase
| Decision (unanimous)
| DEEP: 50th Impact
| 
| align=center| 2
| align=center| 5:00
| Tokyo, Japan
| 
|-
| Win
| align=center| 19–8–1
| Che Mills
| Submission (armbar)
| Astra: Yoshida's Farewell
| 
| align=center| 1
| align=center| 3:59
| Tokyo, Japan
| 
|-
| Win
| align=center| 18–8–1
| Seichi Ikemoto
| Decision (unanimous)
| DEEP: 45 Impact
| 
| align=center| 3
| align=center| 5:00
| Osaka, Japan
| 
|-
| Win
| align=center| 17–8–1
| Shigetoshi Iwase
| Decision (unanimous)
| Deep: 44 Impact
| 
| align=center| 2
| align=center| 5:00
| Tokyo, Japan
| 
|-
| Win
| align=center| 16–8–1
| Gael Grimaud
| TKO (punches)
| M-1 Challenge 18: Netherlands Day One
| 
| align=center| 1
| align=center| 4:16
| Hilversum, Netherlands
| 
|-
| Loss
| align=center| 15–8–1
| Jason High
| Submission (rear-naked choke)
| DREAM 8
| 
| align=center| 1
| align=center| 0:59
| Nagoya, Japan
| 
|-
| Win
| align=center| 15–7–1
| Yoon Young Kim
| Submission (rear-naked choke)
| Deep: clubDeep Tokyo: Protect Cup Final
| 
| align=center| 3
| align=center| 2:59
| Tokyo, Japan
| 
|-
| Win
| align=center| 14–7–1
| Yuichi Nakanishi
| Decision (unanimous)
| Deep: 39 Impact
| 
| align=center| 3
| align=center| 5:00
| Tokyo, Japan
| 
|-
| Win
| align=center| 13–7–1
| Rafael Rodriguez
| Submission (kimura)
| M-1 Challenge 8: USA
| 
| align=center| 1
| align=center| 2:16
| Kansas City, Missouri, United States
| 
|-
| Loss
| align=center| 12–7–1
| Jordan Radev
| Decision (majority)
| M-1 Challenge 6: Korea
| 
| align=center| 2
| align=center| 5:00
| Korea
| 
|-
| Loss
| align=center| 12–6–1
| Riki Fukuda
| Decision (split)
| Deep: 35 Impact
| 
| align=center| 2
| align=center| 5:00
| Tokyo, Japan
| 
|-
| Win
| align=center| 12–5–1
| Sojiro Orui
| Decision (unanimous)
| Deep: 34 Impact
| 
| align=center| 3
| align=center| 5:00
| Tokyo, Japan
| 
|-
| Win
| align=center| 11–5–1
| Kozo Urita
| Submission (armbar)
| Deep: 31 Impact
| 
| align=center| 1
| align=center| 2:42
| Tokyo, Japan
| 
|-
| Win
| align=center| 10–5–1
| Eiji Ishikawa
| Decision (majority)
| Deep: Deep in Yamagata
| 
| align=center| 3
| align=center| 5:00
| Yamagata, Japan
| 
|-
| Loss
| align=center| 9–5–1
| Dae Won Kim
| KO (punch)
| DEEP: 27 Impact
| 
| align=center| 1
| align=center| 3:31
| Tokyo, Japan
| 
|-
| Win
| align=center| 9–4–1
| Jae Suk Lim
| KO (punch)
| Spirit MC 9: Welterweight GP Opening
| 
| align=center| 1
| align=center| 4:17
| Seoul, South Korea
| 
|-
| Win
| align=center| 8–4–1
| Masataka Chinushi
| Submission (guillotine choke)
| Real Rhythm: 4th Stage
| 
| align=center| 1
| align=center| 2:31
| Osaka, Japan
| 
|-
| Loss
| align=center| 7–4–1
| Joey Villaseñor
| Decision (unanimous)
| DEEP: 24 Impact
| 
| align=center| 2
| align=center| 5:00
| Tokyo, Japan
| 
|-
| Win
| align=center| 7–3–1
| Tomoyoshi Iwamiya
| Decision (unanimous)
| DEEP: 23 Impact
| 
| align=center| 2
| align=center| 5:00
| Tokyo, Japan
| 
|-
| Loss
| align=center| 6–3–1
| Ryuji Ohori
| TKO (cut)
| DEEP: 21st Impact
| 
| align=center| 1
| align=center| 4:38
| Tokyo, Japan
| 
|-
| Loss
| align=center| 6–2–1
| Daisuke Watanabe
| Decision (majority)
| Pancrase: Spiral 4
| 
| align=center| 2
| align=center| 5:00
| Yokohama, Japan
| 
|-
| Win
| align=center| 6–1–1
| Ryuhei Sato
| Decision (unanimous)
| DEEP: 18th Impact
| 
| align=center| 2
| align=center| 5:00
| Tokyo, Japan
| 
|-
| Loss
| align=center| 5–1–1
| Yuki Sasaki
| Decision (unanimous)
| Pancrase: Brave 11
| 
| align=center| 3
| align=center| 5:00
| Tokyo, Japan
| 
|-
| Win
| align=center| 5–0–1
| Mitsuyoshi Sato
| Decision (majority)
| Pancrase: Brave 8
| 
| align=center| 2
| align=center| 5:00
| Tokyo, Japan
| 
|-
| Win
| align=center| 4–0–1
| Takahiro Nagata
| TKO (punches)
| DEEP: 15th Impact
| 
| align=center| 1
| align=center| 4:21
| Tokyo, Japan
| 
|-
| Win
| align=center| 3–0–1
| Takashi Ishino
| Decision (majority)
| GCM: Demolition 040408
| 
| align=center| 2
| align=center| 5:00
| Tokyo, Japan
| 
|-
| Win
| align=center| 2–0–1
| Shunichi Akimoto
| Decision (unanimous)
| GCM: Demolition 040118
| 
| align=center| 2
| align=center| 5:00
| Japan
| 
|-
| Draw
| align=center| 1–0–1
| Yasuhiro Kirita
| Draw
| Pancrase: Hybrid 10
| 
| align=center| 2
| align=center| 5:00
| Tokyo, Japan
| 
|-
| Win
| align=center| 1–0
| Toshimitsu Kai
| TKO (punches)
| DEEP: 12th Impact
| 
| align=center| 2
| align=center| 3:48
| Tokyo, Japan
|

See also
 List of current mixed martial arts champions
 List of male mixed martial artists

References

External links
 

1980 births
Living people
Japanese male mixed martial artists
Welterweight mixed martial artists
Japanese male judoka
Japanese sambo practitioners
Deep (mixed martial arts) champions
Mixed martial artists utilizing sambo
Mixed martial artists utilizing judo